Gabriel Antonio Viera Júnior  (born November 14, 1977 in Sorocaba, Brazil) is a Brazilian former professional footballer who played as a midfielder.

Teams
 General Caballero 2011–

References
 
 

1977 births
Living people
Brazilian footballers
Association football midfielders
General Caballero Sport Club footballers
Brazilian expatriate footballers
Brazilian expatriate sportspeople in Paraguay
Expatriate footballers in Paraguay